Cameron Todd Willingham (January 9, 1968 – February 17, 2004) was an American man who was convicted and executed for the murder of his three young children by arson at the family home in Corsicana, Texas, on December 23, 1991. Since Willingham's 2004 execution, significant controversy has arisen over the legitimacy of the guilty verdict and the interpretation of the evidence that was used to convict him of arson and murder.

Willingham's case and the investigative techniques were criticized by a 2004 Chicago Tribune article. The case was discussed again in a 2009 investigative report in The New Yorker. This coverage suggested that the arson evidence was misinterpreted.  According to an August 2009 investigative report by an expert hired by the Texas Forensic Science Commission, the original claims of arson were doubtful. The Corsicana Fire Department disputes the findings, stating that the report overlooked several key points in the record. A 2011 documentary, Incendiary: The Willingham Case, also explored the case.

The case was complicated by allegations that Texas Governor Rick Perry impeded the investigation by replacing three of the nine Forensic Commission members to change the Commission's findings; Perry denies the allegations.

Fire
On December 23, 1991, a fire destroyed the family home of Cameron Todd Willingham in Corsicana, Texas. Killed in the fire were Willingham's three daughters: two-year-old Amber Louise Kuykendall, and one-year-old twins, Karmen Diane Willingham and Kameron Marie Willingham. Willingham himself escaped the home with only minor burns. Stacy Kuykendall, Willingham's then-wife and the mother of his three daughters, was not home at the time of the fire. She was out shopping for Christmas presents at a thrift shop.

Prosecutors charged that Willingham set the fire and killed the children in an attempt to cover up the abuse of the children and wife. However, there was no evidence of child abuse. Kuykendall told prosecutors that he had never abused the children. "Our kids were spoiled rotten," she said, insisting he would never harm their children, but according to Kuykendall, she herself was abused by him.

Investigation and trial

Evidence
After the fire, the police investigation determined that the fire had been started using some form of a liquid accelerant. This evidence included a finding of char patterns in the floor in the shape of "puddles," a finding of multiple starting points of the fire, and a finding that the fire had burned "fast and hot," all considered to indicate a fire that had been ignited with the help of a liquid accelerant. The investigators also found charring under the aluminum front doorjamb, which they believed was a further indication of a liquid accelerant and tested positive for such an accelerant in the area of the front door. No clear motive was found, and Willingham's wife denied that the couple had been fighting prior to the night of the fire.

Witnesses

Johnny Webb
In addition to the arson evidence presented at the trial, a jailhouse informant named Johnny Webb testified at that time. His testimony has been criticized as contentious for several reasons. Webb claimed that Willingham confessed that he set the fire to hide an injury or death of one of the girls, which was caused by his wife. But none of the girls were found at the time of death to have physical injuries that were still distinguishable after the effects of the fire. Webb later told David Grann, a reporter for The New Yorker that he might have been mistaken. He said he was prescribed many medications at that point while being treated for bipolar disorder.

At Willingham's trial, Webb offered an explanation for the individual, distinguishable burns found on Amber's forehead and arm. He said that Willingham confessed to burning her twice with a piece of "wadded up" paper in an effort to make it appear as though the children were "playing with fire."

Prosecutor John Jackson noted that Webb was considered unreliable, but he later supported an early release from prison for Webb. Webb later sent Jackson a "Motion to Recant Testimony," which declared, "Mr. Willingham is innocent of all charges." Willingham's attorneys were not notified. Webb later recanted his recantation. Webb later asked, "The statute of limitations has run out on perjury, hasn't it?"

Webb and Jackson consistently denied that Webb was offered a sentence reduction in return for his testimony against Willingham. Evidence of such a deal would have eliminated Webb's testimony. In February 2014, The New York Times reported that the Innocence Project investigators said that they had discovered a handwritten note in Webb's files indicating that such a deal was in play.

James Grigson
During the penalty phase of the trial, a prosecutor said that Willingham's tattoo of a skull and serpent fit the profile of a sociopath. Two medical experts confirmed the theory. A psychologist was asked to interpret Willingham's Iron Maiden poster. He said that a picture of a fist punching through a skull signified violence and death. He added that Willingham's Led Zeppelin poster of a fallen angel was "many times" an indicator of "cultive-type" activities.

Psychiatrist James Grigson, known by the moniker "Dr. Death" for his repeated testimony as an expert witness in which he recommended the death penalty, said that a man of Willingham's criminal history was an "extremely severe sociopath" and was incurable. Grigson had served as an expert witness for the prosecution in murder trials across the state of Texas. Prior to his death, he was expelled by the American Psychiatric Association and the Texas Society of Psychiatric Physicians for unethical conduct. The APA said that Grigson had violated the organization's ethics code by

"arriving at a psychiatric diagnosis without first having examined the individuals in question, and for indicating, while testifying in court as an expert witness, that he could predict with 100 per cent certainty that the individuals would engage in future violent acts."

The prosecution sought to establish that Willingham's conduct at the time of the fire and in the days afterward was suspicious. As the fire took hold, Willingham was driven out through the front door of his house, where he crouched down near the entrance. On seeing neighbor Diane Barbee, Willingham began to shout at her to call 911, shouting "My babies are in there!" At trial, Willingham's conduct at the scene was described as oscillating between collected and hysterical — at times screaming for assistance and at other times calmly pushing his car back from the flames that were engulfing his house. Willingham later said that he removed the car out of concern that it could explode and worsen the house fire.

Witnesses to the event and days after
Eyewitnesses described Willingham as having "singed hair on his chest, eyelids, and head and had a two-inch burn injury on his right shoulder, but the prosecution highlighted the absence of any evidence of smoke inhalation. His wrists and hands were blackened with smoke. He was eventually transported to the hospital for treatment, in handcuffs."

According to their sworn statements, both Brandice Barbee and Diane Barbee urged Willingham to return to the house to rescue his children. According to Brandice Barbee, "All I could see was smoke." According to Brandice, he refused, and moved his car away from the fire before returning to sit on a nearby lawn, "not once attempting to go inside to rescue his children." Once the fire had reached flashover and the fire department arrived, Willingham became far more agitated, to the point of being restrained by emergency services.

In the following days, Willingham returned to the house with some family and friends. Neighbors described this group as having an odd levity, which was seen to turn somber on the arrival of authorities. On returning to the scene of the fire with firefighter Ron Franks, in an effort to recover personal property (which was described as a very usual request at trial), Willingham was visibly dismayed at being unable to find a dart set. At a local bar, where a fundraiser was held for the Willingham family, he placed an order for a replacement set, stating that "money was not a problem now."

Motive
The prosecution claimed that Willingham may have been motivated by a desire to rid himself of unwanted children. The prosecutor claimed that the fire that killed the children was the third attempt by Willingham to kill them, and that he had attempted to abort each of his wife's two pregnancies by kicking her in order to cause miscarriages.

But journalist David Grann reported that "...there is evidence that Willingham hit his wife, even when she was pregnant, but there were no police reports or medical evidence indicating that Willingham had tried to abort or kill his children." He wrote, "Willingham's wife insisted during the trial and under interrogation that Willingham had not physically abused the children." The testimony at trial of Johnny Webb, a jailhouse informant, suggested that Willingham had set the fire in order to cover up an injury or death of one of the children due to his wife's actions.

The prosecutor also said that Willingham was a serial wife abuser, both physically and emotionally. Jackson said Willingham had abused animals and was a sociopath. However, those not associated with the case paint a different picture of Willingham. His former probation officer, Polly Goodin, said he had never demonstrated bizarre or sociopathic behavior and that "He was probably one of my favorite kids." Bebe Bridges, a former judge who was often on the "opposite side" of Willingham in the legal system, and who had sent him to jail for stealing, said that she could not imagine him killing his children. "He was polite, and he seemed to care," she said.

Trial
Willingham was charged with murder on January 8, 1992. During his trial in August 1992, he was offered a life term in exchange for a guilty plea, which he turned down, insisting he was innocent.

At trial, the fire investigator Vasquez testified there were three points of origin for the fire, which indicated that the fire was "intentionally set by human hands." A sample of burned material near the doorway of the house tested positive for mineral spirits, indicating the presence of lighter fluid. Willingham had escaped the fire with bare feet and no burn marks. This was taken as evidence that the accelerant was poured by Willingham as he left the house. Several witnesses testified for the prosecution.

In 2009, John Jackson, the prosecutor at the trial, stated that burns suffered by Willingham were "so superficial as to suggest that the same were self-inflicted in an attempt to divert suspicion from himself." Grann, however, said fire investigators who reviewed the case told him that "Willingham's first-degree and second-degree burns were consistent with being in a fire before the moment of 'flashover' — that is, when everything in a room suddenly ignites."

Commenting on the condition of the house, Jackson added, "any escape or rescue route from the burning house was blocked by a refrigerator, which had been pushed against the back door, requiring any person attempting an escape to run through the conflagration at the front of the house." There were two refrigerators in the Willingham house. Jimmie Hensley, a police detective, and Douglas Fogg, the assistant fire chief — who both investigated the fire — told Grann that they had never believed that the refrigerator was part of the arson plot. "It didn't have [anything] to do with the fire," Fogg said.

Jackson contradicted Willingham's account by claiming blood gas analysis at Navarro Regional Hospital shortly after the fire revealed that Willingham had not inhaled any smoke. Willingham's statement and eyewitness accounts had detailed rescue attempts.

Consistent with typical Navarro County death penalty practice, Willingham was offered the opportunity to eliminate himself as a suspect by polygraph examination, which Willingham rejected, according to Jackson. Against the advice of his own counsel, Willingham declined a life sentence in exchange for his guilty plea. He insisted he would not admit to something he had not done, even if it meant sparing his life. During his trial, Willingham did not testify; the defense called only one witness, the Willinghams' babysitter, who stated that she believed that Willingham could not have killed his children.

Appeals, incarceration, and execution

Willingham had the Texas Department of Criminal Justice number 999041. While on death row, Willingham was initially incarcerated in the Ellis Unit, and later in the Polunsky Unit.

Willingham's case gained attention in December 2004, when Maurice Possley and Steve Mills of the Chicago Tribune published on poor investigative tactics. In 2009, an investigative report by Grann drew upon analysis by arson investigation experts and advances in fire science since the 1992 investigation; he suggested that the evidence for arson was unconvincing. He suggested that, had this information been available at the time of trial, it would have provided grounds for Willingham's acquittal. The 2011 documentary Incendiary: The Willingham Case also explored the case.

Willingham maintained his innocence up until his death and spent years trying to appeal his conviction. The Texas Court of Criminal Appeals denied Willingham a writ of habeas corpus a month before his execution. Willingham was executed by lethal injection on February 17, 2004, at the Texas State Penitentiary in Huntsville. He was 36 years old.

Gerald Hurst
In 2004, Gerald Hurst examined the arson evidence compiled by state deputy fire marshal Manuel Vasquez. Hurst individually discredited each piece of arson evidence, using publicly supported experiments backed by his re-creation of the elements in question, the most notable being the Lime Street fire, which created the unique 3-point burn patterns flashover.

This left only the chemical testing for accelerant. The front porch was the only place where an accelerant was verified by laboratory tests, and a photograph taken of the house before the fire showed that a charcoal grill was there. Hurst speculated that it was likely that water sprayed by firefighters had spread the lighter fluid from the melted container. All twenty of the indications listed by Vasquez of an accelerant being used were rebutted by Hurst, who concluded there was "no evidence of arson" — the same conclusion reached by other fire investigators.

Hurst's report was sent to governor Rick Perry's office, as well as the Board of Pardons and Paroles along with Willingham's appeal for clemency. Neither responded to Willingham's appeals. In response to allegations that he allowed the execution of an innocent man, Perry was quoted as stating, "Willingham was a monster. He was a guy who murdered his three children, who tried to beat his wife into an abortion so that he wouldn't have those kids. Person after person has stood up and testified to facts of this case that quite frankly you all aren't covering."

But Hurst said, "The whole case was based on the purest form of junk science. There was no item of evidence that indicated arson." A spokeswoman for Governor Perry said he had weighed the "totality of the issues that led to (Willingham's) conviction." The spokeswoman added he was aware of a "claim of a reinterpretation of (the) arson testimony."

Question of guilt
Since Willingham's execution, persistent questions have been raised as to the accuracy of the forensic evidence used in the conviction: specifically, whether it can be proven that an accelerant (such as the lighter fluid mentioned above) was used to start the fatal fire. Fire investigator Gerald L. Hurst reviewed the case documents, including the trial transcriptions and an hour-long videotape of the aftermath of the fire scene. Hurst said in December 2004 that "There's nothing to suggest to any reasonable arson investigator that this was an arson fire. It was just a fire."

In June 2009, the State of Texas ordered a re-examination of the case. In August 2009, eighteen years after the fire and five years after Willingham's execution, a report conducted by Dr. Craig Beyler, hired by the Texas Forensic Science Commission to review the case, found that "a finding of arson could not be sustained." Beyler said key testimony from a fire marshal at Willingham's trial was "hardly consistent with a scientific mind-set and is more characteristic of mystics or psychics."

The prosecutor, John Jackson, and the City of Corsicana have both released formal responses to the Beyler Report on the investigation of the fire that killed Willingham's three children at the behest of the Texas Forensic Science Commission. Both were sharply critical of Beyler. In a 2009 article discussing the reasons why Willingham was found guilty, Jackson recalled witness statements establishing that Willingham was overheard whispering to his deceased older daughter at the funeral home, "You're not the one who was supposed to die." Jackson stated that Willingham's comment was an indicator of guilt. In a rebuttal, Grann wrote,

"If the arson investigators had concluded that there was no scientific evidence that a crime had occurred — as the top fire investigators in the country have now determined — Willingham's words at the funeral would surely be viewed as a sign that he was tormented by the fact that he had survived without saving his children."

An August 2009 Chicago Tribune investigative article concluded, "Over the past five years, the Willingham case has been reviewed by nine of the nation's top fire scientists — first for the Tribune, then for the Innocence Project, and now for the commission. All concluded that the original investigators relied on outdated theories and folklore to justify the determination of arson. The only other evidence of significance against Willingham was twice-recanted testimony by another inmate, who testified that Willingham had confessed to him. Jailhouse informants are viewed with skepticism in the justice system, so much so that some jurisdictions have restrictions against their use."

The Texas Forensic Science Commission was scheduled to discuss the report by Beyler at a meeting on October 2, 2009, but two days before the meeting, Texas Governor Rick Perry replaced the chair of the commission (Sam Bassett) and two other members (Alan Levy and Aliece Watts). The new chair, John Bradley, canceled the meeting, sparking accusations that Perry was interfering with the investigation and using it for his own political advantage.

In October 2009, the city of Corsicana released two affidavits that included statements from Ronnie Kuykendall, the former brother-in-law of Willingham, originally made in 2004. According to the affidavits, Willingham's ex-wife had told Ronnie that Willingham confessed to her that he had set the fire. On October 25, Stacy Kuykendall told the Fort Worth Star-Telegram that during a final prison meeting just weeks before he was put to death, Willingham admitted setting the fire in response to Stacy's alleged threats of divorce the night before.

Journalists familiar with the case noted that Stacy Kuykendall's statement explicitly contradicted previous comments, legal testimony, and numerous published interviews before and after the execution. "It's hard for me to make heads or tails of anything she said or didn't say," Willingham's prosecutor said. For example, earlier in 2009, Kuykendall supported her 2004 contradiction of her brother's affidavit (saying that there had been no confession) and had previously always maintained that things had been amicable between her and Willingham before the fire. In 2010, she declared, "Todd murdered Amber, Karmon, and Kameron. He burnt them. He admitted he burnt them to me, and he was convicted for his crime. That is the closest to justice that my daughters will ever get."

A four-person panel of the Texas Forensic Science Commission investigating evidence of arson presented in the case acknowledged on July 23, 2010, that state and local arson investigators used "flawed science" in determining that the blaze had been deliberately set. It also found insufficient evidence to prove that state Deputy Fire Marshal Manuel Vasquez and Corsicana Assistant Fire Chief Douglas Fogg were negligent or guilty of misconduct in their arson work.

In 2010, the Innocence Project filed a lawsuit against the State of Texas, seeking a judgment of "official oppression." Judge Charlie Baird held an inquiry in September 2010 in Austin, but Lowell Thompson, the Navarro County DA, appeared at the hearing with a motion for Baird to recuse himself due to conflict of interest — Baird had once affirmed Willingham's conviction while sitting as a Criminal Appeals judge yet had also been recognized by an anti-death penalty group. When the recusal motion was denied, Thompson appealed to the Third Court of Appeals and had the proceedings stayed. (Thompson later received an award from the Texas District and County Attorneys Association for this motion and appeal.)

In 2014, the Washington Post reported that new evidence emerged indicating that Webb had said in taped interviews that he lied on the witness stand in exchange for a prosecutor's help obtaining a reduced prison term and financial support from a rich rancher. On March 3, 2015, the Texas State Bar filed a disciplinary action, Commission for Lawyer Discipline v. Jackson, against Jackson for failing to disclose information on his deal with Webb. According to the complaint, "During a pretrial hearing on July 24, 1992, [Jackson] told the trial court that he had no evidence favorable to Willingham. That statement was false." A jury later heard and rejected the claim that Jackson had hid evidence, finding in favor of Jackson.

Films
Incendiary: The Willingham Case, a 2011 documentary film covering the case and its aftermath, won the Louis Black Award at the South by Southwest Film Festival.

David Grann's investigative article in The New Yorker titled "Trial by Fire" (collected in The Devil and Sherlock Holmes) was adapted into the 2018 film Trial by Fire directed by Edward Zwick starring Laura Dern and Jack O'Connell as Willingham.

In popular culture 

 Episode 21, Season 11 of Law & Order: SVU, titled "Torch," is based on this case. 
 Episode 9, Season 2 of The Good Wife, titled "Nine Hours," is based on this case.
 Episode 17, Season 7 of Cold Case, titled "Flashover," is based on this case.
 Trial by Fire (2018 film) is based on this case.
Season 9, episode 1 of Evil Lives Here. Told from the perspective of Stacy Kuykendall.
 The song “Corsicana” on the album Burst Apart by the rock band The Antlers  is based on the event.

See also

 Carlos DeLuna
 Clarence Elkins
 Michael Morton
 Capital punishment in Texas
 Capital punishment in the United States
 List of people executed in Texas, 2000–2009
 List of people executed in the United States in 2004
 List of wrongful convictions in the United States

References

Further reading

 
 Offender Information. Texas Department of Criminal Justice. Retrieved on 2018-12-2.
 Last Statement. Texas Department of Criminal Justice. Retrieved on 2004-03-22.
 Cameron Todd Willingham. The Clark County Prosecuting Attorney. Retrieved on 2007-11-20.
 Blumenthal, Ralph. Faulty Testimony Sent 2 to Death Row, Panel Finds. The New York Times (2006-05-03). Retrieved on 2007-11-20.

External links
 City of Corsicana Response to Beyler Report, 29 September 2009
 . – Texas Attorney General – Friday February 13, 2004
 Analysis of the Fire Investigation Methods and Procedures Used in the Criminal Arson Case Against Ernest Ray Willis and Cameran Todd Willingham – Craig L. Beyler.
 Willingham Files – A collection of all stories published by the Corsicana Daily Sun
 "Media Advisory: Cameron Todd Willingham Scheduled For Execution." Texas Attorney General
  (Video)
 
 Innocence Project case summary
 PBS portal on the Cameron Todd Willingham case – including original documents
 a shorter summary of the Cameron Todd Willingham case – a slide show presentation

1968 births
2004 deaths
21st-century executions by Texas
21st-century executions of American people
American murderers of children
American people convicted of murder
Filicides in Texas
People convicted of murder by Texas
People executed by Texas by lethal injection
People executed for murder
People from Corsicana, Texas